Alcuin Schulten (born 1972) is a Dutch former figure skater. He competed for the Netherlands in men's singles and in pair skating with his sister Jeltje Schulten.

Results

Single skating for the Netherlands

Pairs with Jeltje Schulten for the Netherlands

External links
results

1972 births
Living people
Dutch male single skaters
Pair skaters
Radboud University Nijmegen alumni
Sportspeople from Rotterdam